State leaders in the 4th & 3rd millennia BC – State leaders in the 19th century BC – State leaders by year
This is a list of state leaders in the 20th century BC (2000–1901 BC).

Africa: Northeast

Kush
Kingdom of Kush (complete list) –
Kaa, King (c.1900 BC)

Egypt: Middle Kingdom
Eleventh Dynasty of the Middle Kingdom (complete list) –
Mentuhotep III, King (2010–1998 BC)
Mentuhotep IV, King (1998–1991)

Nubia of the Middle Kingdom (complete list) –
Segerseni, King (early 20th century BC)
Qakare Ini, King (early 20th century BC)
Iyibkhentre, King (early 20th century BC)

Twelfth Dynasty of the Middle Kingdom (complete list) –
Amenemhat I, King (1991–1962 BC)
Senusret I, King (1971–1926 BC)
Amenemhat II, King (1914–1879/6 BC, 1878–1843 BC, or 1877/6–1843/2 BC)

Asia

Asia: East 
China

Asia: Southeast
Vietnam
Hồng Bàng dynasty (complete list) –
Chấn line, (c.2252–c.1913 BC)
Tốn line, (c.1912–c.1713 BC)

Asia: West
Assyria
Kings whose Eponyms Are not Known

Old Period

Elam

References 

State Leaders
-
20th-century BC rulers

fr:XXe siècle av. J.-C.